Charles W. Baker (July 10, 1876 – February 26, 1963) was an American farmer and politician.

Biography
Baker was born in Monroe Center, Ogle County, Illinois. He owned a farm in Davis Junction, Illinois. He served as a township tax collector and road commissioner. Baker served on the Ogle County Board and was a Republican. He served in the Illinois House of Representatives from 1917 to 1926 and then served in the Illinois Senate from 1927 to 1956. Baker and his wife then moved to Rockford, Illinois. He fell and fractured his hip, at his home, on January 21, 1963; subsequently he became ill and later died at St. Anthony's Hospital in Rockford.

References

External links

1876 births
1963 deaths
People from Ogle County, Illinois
Politicians from Rockford, Illinois
Farmers from Illinois
County board members in Illinois
Republican Party members of the Illinois House of Representatives
Republican Party Illinois state senators